Nəsibli (also, Khakhollar) is a village in the Tovuz Rayon of Azerbaijan.  The village forms part of the municipality of Göyəbaxan.

References

External links

Populated places in Tovuz District